Vystavka is a rural locality (a village) in Votlazhemsky Selsoviet of Kotlassky District of Arkhangelsk Oblast, Russia. The population was 171 as of 2010.

It is the largest rural locality in the selsoviet, with the population of 202 as of January 2005. 

Within the framework of municipal divisions, the village has since 2006 been a part of Cheryomushskoye Rural Settlement.

 is located in Vystavka. The baroque church was built in 1753 and was closed for service in 1932. It is now deserted and neglected. The church is designated as a cultural heritage monument of local significance.

References

Rural localities in Kotlassky District